Cremnocereus is a genus of flowering plants belonging to the family Cactaceae.

Its native range is Bolivia.

Species:
 Cremnocereus albipilosus M.Lowry & Winberg

References

Cactoideae
Cactoideae genera